Best Mate (28 January 1995 – 1 November 2005) was an Irish-bred,  English-trained racehorse and three-time winner of the Cheltenham Gold Cup. He was considered one of the most loved horses in the history of horse racing in the UK, with his sudden death while racing making front-page news.

Background
The horse was owned by Jim Lewis and trained by Henrietta Knight. He was sired by Un Desperado, a French stallion who won the Prix Eugène Adam in 1986.

In 2000 a share of 40% was sold to Markus Jooste for the sum of £242,000.

Racing career
Best Mate won the Cheltenham Gold Cup in 2002, 2003, and 2004 with jockey Jim Culloty, matching the record of Arkle, but was withdrawn from the 2005 race eight days before the event due to bursting a blood vessel on the gallops. He also missed the 2001 festival due to the foot and mouth crisis where he was the favourite for the Arkle Challenge Trophy. He won the 2002 King George VI Chase and the 2003 Ericsson Chase.

Best Mate never fell at a fence or hurdle. Out of 22 starts, he came first in 14 of them and second in seven, the 22nd race being the one he was pulled up in shortly before his death. Of the seven races in which he finished second, five were Group 1 races, and two were Group 2 races. Like Arkle, Best Mate won three successive Cheltenham Gold Cups.  He ran in one handicap chase (2001/2002 First National Gold Cup), where he failed by 1/2 length to give 20 lbs to Wahiba Sands. He was the first horse to win the Gold Cup more than once since L'Escargot in 1970 and 1971.

Death

Best Mate collapsed and died of a suspected heart attack after being pulled up by jockey Paul Carberry whilst competing in the William Hill Haldon Gold Cup at Exeter Racecourse on 1 November 2005. After the jockey dismounted, the horse stumbled and went onto his knees. Best Mate's death was national news, with headlines including Who can fill the void left by Best Mate?, Best Mate leaves golden memories after giving his all for final time, Heartbreak at Exeter as Best Mate collapses and dies and Perfect horse Best Mate dies at trainer's feet.

Government regulations prevented the burial of his body on the Exeter course as Lewis and many racing fans desired. Instead Best Mate was cremated, and his ashes were buried beside the winning post at Cheltenham Racecourse on 10 December 2005. Lewis was in attendance even though his wife, Valerie, had died on 8 December after a 7-month battle against cancer.

Assessment and honours
The highest Timeform rating for Arkle was 212, while Best Mate's highest rating was 182. Timeform themselves felt that Best Mate's rating could have been higher if he had raced in more handicaps.

There is now a bronze statue in memory of Best Mate near the farm at which he was trained  in Lockinge. At the Cheltenham Festival the following year, a statue of Best Mate was revealed. He was made one of the elite 12 on the Cheltenham Hall of Fame in March 2007. In a DVD about him, Alastair Down narrates:

Pedigree

See also
 Repeat winners of horse races
 List of historical horses

References

1995 racehorse births
2005 racehorse deaths
Cheltenham Gold Cup winners
Cheltenham Festival winners
Thoroughbred family 1-e
Racehorses trained in the United Kingdom
Racehorses bred in Ireland
National Hunt racehorses